Bwela, or Lingi, is a poorly known Congolese Bantu language of uncertain affiliation (though listed as Zone C.40 by Guthrie). It may be close to Tembo.

References

Bantu languages
Languages of the Democratic Republic of the Congo
Buja-Ngombe languages